Drott may refer to:

 Drott Manufacturing Company
 Drott, a trademark of the Swedish company Pythagoras
HK Drott,  handball club, based in Halmstad, Sweden
Dick Drott, American baseballer

See also
Drot (disambiguation)